Pennin Perumai is a 1956 Indian Tamil-language film starring Sivaji Ganesan, Gemini Ganesan, Savitri and Santha Kumari. It is a remake of the Telugu film Ardhangi, which was based on Maddipatla Suri's Telugu translation of the Bengali novel Swayamsiddha, written by Manilal Banerjee. The film was released on 17 February 1956.

Plot 

Padma is forced to marry a mentally dull  man Raghu, whom she eventually makes a normal human while teaching a lesson to her scheming mother-in-law and brother-in-law Nagu.

Cast 
Sivaji Ganesan as Nagu
Gemini Ganesan as Ragu
Savitri as Padma
Santha Kumari as Rajeswari
V. Nagayya as Zamindar
M. N. Rajam as Neela

Production 
Pennin Perumai was the first film where Gemini and Sivaji Ganesan acted together.

Soundtrack 
The music was composed by B. N. Rao and A. Rama Rao. Background score was provided by Master Venu. All lyrics were penned by Thanjai N. Ramaiah Dass. The song "Azhuvadhaa Illai Sirippadhaa" is the first duet T. M. Soundararajan and P. Susheela sang together.

Reception 
Kanthan of Kalki praised the performances of the main cast, especially Gemini Ganesan for deviating from the caring, affectionate and romantic characters he was known for portraying.

References

External links 

1950s Tamil-language films
1956 films
Films based on adaptations
Films directed by P. Pullayya
Tamil remakes of Telugu films
Films scored by Master Venu
Films scored by B. N. Rao
Films scored by A. Rama Rao